Gaagudju (also spelt Gagadu, Gaguju, and Kakadu) is an extinct Australian Aboriginal language formerly spoken in the environs of Kakadu National Park, in Arnhem Land, Northern Territory, Australia.

Country and status
Explorer Baldwin Spencer incorrectly ascribed the name "Kakadu tribe" to all of the people living in the Alligator Rivers area, but Gaagudju was confined to the plains South and East Alligator Rivers.

The language is classed as extinct, since its last fluent speaker, Big Bill Neidjie, died on 23 May 2002; AUSTLANG's sources recorded no speakers between 1975 and 2016.

Classification
Gaagudju has traditionally been classified with the Gunwinyguan languages. However, in 1997 Nicholas Evans proposed an Arnhem Land family that includes Gaagudju.

Phonology

Vowels

Consonants

Vocabulary
Capell (1942) lists the following basic vocabulary items:

{| class="wikitable sortable"
! gloss !! Gagadu
|-
| man || 
|-
| woman || 
|-
| head || 
|-
| eye || 
|-
| nose || 
|-
| mouth || 
|-
| tongue || 
|-
| stomach || 
|-
| bone || 
|-
| blood || 
|-
| kangaroo || 
|-
| opossum || 
|-
| emu || 
|-
| crow || 
|-
| fly || 
|-
| sun || 
|-
| moon || 
|-
| fire || 
|-
| smoke || 
|-
| water || 
|}

References

External links

AusAnthrop Australian Aboriginal tribal database

Extinct languages of the Northern Territory
Macro-Gunwinyguan languages
Language isolates of Australia
Languages extinct in the 2000s